= Gary Schofield (American football) =

Profile
- Position: Quarterback

Personal information
- Born: c. 1962

Career information
- College: Wake Forest (1981–1983)

Gary Schofield (born c. 1962) is a former American football quarterback. He played college football for the Wake Forest Demon Deacons from 1981 to 1983. As a sophomore in 1981, he ranked among the leading quarterbacks in major-college football with 22 passing interceptions (1st), 6.4 passing yards per attempt (4th), 241 pass completions (5th), 404 pass attempts (5th), 461 total plays (6th), a 59.7% completion percentage (7th), 2,572 passing yards (10th), 233.8 yards gained per game played (10th), and 18 passing touchdowns (10th). He concluded his career at Wake Forest with 7,205 passing yards.
